Sar Dowkaneh (also Romanized as Sar Dowkāneh) is a village in Qarah Su Rural District, in the Central District of Kermanshah County, Kermanshah Province, Iran. At the 2006 census, its population was 82, in 16 families.

References 

Populated places in Kermanshah County